Amar Bahadur Gurung was a former Indian association football player who was part of the squad that secured the bronze medal at the 1970 Asian Games hosted at Bangkok. He scored the winning goal against Japan which secured the medal.

Honours

India
Asian Games Bronze Medal: 1970
Merdeka Tournament third place: 1970
Pesta Sukan Cup: 1971

Gorkha Brigade
Durand Cup: 1966, 1969

References

1942 births
2016 deaths
Sportspeople from Dehradun
Footballers from Uttarakhand
Indian Gorkhas
Indian footballers
Asian Games bronze medalists for India
Asian Games medalists in football
Medalists at the 1970 Asian Games
Footballers at the 1970 Asian Games
Gurung people
Association football forwards
Mumbai Football League players